This is a list of Romanian philosophers.

 Petre Andrei
 Simion Bărnuțiu 
 Ştefan Bârsănescu
 Lucian Blaga
 Emil Cioran
 Vasile Conta
 Alexandru Dragomir
 Mihai Dragomirescu
 Mihai Drăgănescu
 Mircea Eliade
 Gheorghe Enescu
 Mircea E. Florian
 Dumitru Gheorghiu
 Constantin Grecu
 Nae Ionescu
 Sorin Lavric
 Gabriel Liiceanu
 Virgil Nemoianu
 Constantin Noica
 Camil Petrescu
 Ion Petrovici
 Mihai Ralea
 Constantin Rădulescu-Motru
 Dumitru D. Roșca
 Alexandru Tănase
 Tudor Vianu
  Mircea Vulcănescu
 A.D. Xenopol

Philosophers
 
Romanian